Arroz con leche (meaning rice with milk) may refer to:

The Spanish version of rice pudding
"Arroz con leche" a Spanish children's song
Arroz Con Leche (album), an album by Mexican rock band Panda
Arroz con leche (1950 film), an Argentine comedy film
Arroz con leche (TV series), a 2007 Venezuelan telenovela
Arroz con leche, an 2009 Argentine comedy film starring Isabel Sarli